The Songhua or Sunghwa River (also Haixi or Xingal,  Sungari) is one of the primary rivers of China, and the longest tributary of the Amur.

The extreme flatness of the Northeast China Plain has caused the river to meander over time, filling the wide plain with oxbow lakes, as remnants of the previous paths of the river.

Geography
The Songhua rises south of Heaven Lake, near the China-North Korea border.

From there it flows north, to be interrupted by the Baishan, Hongshi and Fengman hydroelectric dams. Below the dam, the Second Songhua flows north through Jilin, then northwest until it is joined by its largest tributary, the Nen River, near Da'an, to create the Songhua proper.

The Songhua turns east through Harbin, and after the city, it is joined from the south by the Ashi River, and then by the Hulan River from the north.

A new dam was constructed in 2007 near Bayan (50 km northeast of Harbin), creating the Dadingshan Reservoir, which is named after the scenic area on the south bank.

The river flows onward through Jiamusi and south of the Lesser Xing'an Range, to eventually join the Amur at Tongjiang, Heilongjiang.

The river freezes from late November until March. It has its highest flows when the mountain snow melts during the spring thaw. The river is navigable up to Harbin by medium-sized ships. Smaller craft can navigate the Songhua up to Jilin and the Nen River up to Qiqihar.

Cities along the river include:
 Jilin
 Harbin
 Jiamusi

History

In November 2005, the river was contaminated with benzene, leading to a shutdown of Harbin's water supply. The spill stretched  and eventually reached the Amur (Heilong) River on the China–Russia border. On July 28, 2010, several thousand barrels from two chemical plants in China's Jilin City were washed away by floods. Some of them contained  of explosive material like trimethylsilyl chloride and hexamethyldisiloxane. In 2016, the part near the city of Jilin was affected by a minor flood.

See also 
 Geography of China
 Mudanjiang River
 "Along the Songhua River", a Chinese patriotic song

References

External links 

 
Rivers of Heilongjiang
Rivers of Jilin
Geography of Harbin
Jilin City
Geography of Yanbian